Tetrameres is a genus of nematodes belonging to the family Tetrameridae.

Species:

Tetrameres fissispina 
Tetrameres salina 
Tetrameres tarapungae

References

Nematodes